Beri Thimappa / Thimmanna was the dubash (interpreter) and chief negotiator for Francis Day and Andrew Cogan, the agents of the British East India Company, and was instrumental in the purchase of Madras from the Nayak brothers. Beri Thimmappa migrated in the early 17th century to Chennai from palakollu, near Machilipatnam in Andhra Pradesh. He established a Black Town outside the walls of the newly built Fort of Madras which later became Fort St George.

His families were chief merchants of East India Company for several decades. Thimmappa's brother Beri Venkatadri owned Guindy Lodge, which is present Tamil Nadu Raj Bhavan.He is one of the founder of Madras state. He belongs to Perike (Puragiri Kshatriya) caste.

References

History of Chennai
Year of birth missing
Year of death missing
People from Palakollu